The Kuskokwim River or Kusko River (Yup'ik: Kusquqvak; Deg Xinag: Digenegh; Upper Kuskokwim: Dichinanek' ;  (Kuskokvim)) is a river,  long, in Southwest Alaska in the United States.  It is the ninth largest river in the United States by average discharge volume at its mouth and seventeenth largest by basin drainage area. The Kuskokwim River is the longest river system contained entirely within a single U.S. state.

The river provides the principal drainage for an area of the remote Alaska Interior on the north and west side of the Alaska Range, flowing southwest into Kuskokwim Bay on the Bering Sea. The highest point in its watershed is Mount Russell. Except for its headwaters in the mountains, the river is broad and flat for its entire course, making it a useful transportation route for many types of watercraft, as well as road vehicles during the winter when it is frozen over.  It is the longest free flowing river in the United States.

Kuskokwim is a loose transliteration of a Yup'ik word. It is a compound word meaning big slow moving thing.

The Alaska Natives of Kuskokwim are Yup'ik Eskimo on the lower Kuskokwim, Deg Hit'an Athabaskan on the middle Kuskokwim, Upper Kuskokwim Athabaskan on the upper Kuskokwim, and Koyukon Athabaskan on the North Fork, Lake Minchumina.

Name 

The river's name comes from the Yup'ik, kusquqviim, recorded by a Russian sailor in 1826. The Tanana (Athabaskan) name for the river was Chin-ana. Upper Kuskokwim (Kolchan) is often used to mean the people of the upper parts of the river, while Yup'ik people live along the lower river.

Course

From there it flows southwest to Kuskokwim Bay and the Bering Sea.

The Kuskokwim is fed by several forks in central and south-central Alaska. The North Fork (250 mi/400 km) rises in the Kuskokwim Mountains approximately 200 miles (320 km) WSW of Fairbanks and flows southwest in a broad valley. The South Fork (200 mi/320 km) rises in the southwestern end of the Alaska Range west of Mount Gerdine and flows north-northwest through the mountains, past Nikolai, receiving other streams that descend from the Alaska Range northwest of Denali. The two forks join near Medfra, and from there the main stem of the Kuskokwim flows southwest, past McGrath, in a remote valley between the Kuskokwim Mountains to the north and the Alaska Range to the south.

In southwest Alaska the river emerges from the Kuskokwim Mountains in a vast lake-studded alluvial plain south of the Yukon River, surrounded by vast spruce forests. It passes a series of Yup'ik villages, including Aniak, and approaches within 50 mi (80 km) of the Yukon before diverging southwest. Southwest of Bethel, the largest community on the river, it broadens into a wide marshy delta that enters Kuskokwim Bay approximately 50 mi (80 km) SSW of Bethel. The lower river below Aniak is located within the Yukon Delta National Wildlife Refuge.

The river receives the Big River from the south approximately 20 miles (32 km) southwest of Medfra. It receives the Swift, Stony, and Holitna rivers from the south at the southern end of the Kuskokwim Mountains before emerging on the coastal plain. It receives the Aniak River from the south at Aniak. Approximately 20 miles (32 km) upstream from Bethel it receives the Kisaralik and Kwethluk rivers from the south. It receives the Eek River from the east at Eek near its mouth on Kuskokwim Bay.

History 

The principal economic activities along the river have historically been fur trapping and fishing. Subsistence fishing for salmon and whitefish provides a staple of the Yup'ik diet along the river. Economic deposits of placer gold were discovered in 1901 near Aniak. Mineral production in the region has mainly been from scattered placer gold deposits that through 2004 had produced a total of 3.5 million troy ounces of gold. The primary route of the Iditarod Trail follows the South Fork Kuskokwim River out of the Alaska Range and crosses the main stem of the river near McGrath.

See also 
List of rivers of Alaska
List of longest rivers of the United States (by main stem)
Kuskokwim Bay
Kuskokwim Delta
Kuskokwim Mountains
Kuskokwim 300

References

Works cited
Benke, Arthur C., ed., and Cushing, Colbert E., ed. (2005). Rivers of North America. Burlington, Massachusetts: Elsevier Academic Press. .
Bright, William. (2004). Native American Placenames of the United States. Norman, Oklahoma: University of Oklahoma Press. .

External links 

 Iditarod National Historic Trail
 Kuskokwim River Watershed Council
 Iyana Gusty and the Kuskokwim

Drainage basins of the Bering Sea
Rivers of Bethel Census Area, Alaska
Rivers of Alaska
Rivers of Yukon–Koyukuk Census Area, Alaska
Rivers of Unorganized Borough, Alaska
Braided rivers in Alaska